This is a list of electoral divisions and wards in the ceremonial county of East Sussex in South East England. All changes since the re-organisation of local government following the passing of the Local Government Act 1972 are shown. The number of councillors elected for each electoral division or ward is shown in brackets.

County council

East Sussex
Electoral Divisions from 1 April 1974 (first election 12 April 1973) to 2 May 1985:

Electoral Divisions from 2 May 1985 to 5 May 2005:

Electoral Divisions from 5 May 2005 to 4 May 2017:

† minor boundary changes in 2009

Electoral Divisions from 4 May 2017 to present:

Unitary authority council

Brighton and Hove
Wards from 1 April 1997 (first election 2 May 1996) to 1 May 2003:

Wards from 1 May 2003 to present:

District councils

Eastbourne
Wards from 1 April 1974 (first election 7 June 1973) to 6 May 1976:

Wards from 6 May 1976 to 2 May 2002:

Wards from 2 May 2002 to present (boundary changes in 2019):

Hastings
Wards from 1 April 1974 (first election 7 June 1973) to 3 May 1979:

Wards from 3 May 1979 to 2 May 2002:

Wards from 2 May 2002 to present (boundary changes in 2018):

Lewes
Wards from 1 April 1974 (first election 7 June 1973) to 5 May 1983:

Wards from 5 May 1983 to 1 May 2003:

Wards from 1 May 2003 to 2 May 2019:

Wards from 2 May 2019 to present:

Rother
Wards from 1 April 1974 (first election 7 June 1973) to 5 May 1983:

Wards from 5 May 1983 to 1 May 2003:

Wards from 1 May 2003 to 2 May 2019:

Wards from 2 May 2019 to present:

Wealden
Wards from 1 April 1974 (first election 7 June 1973) to 5 May 1983:

Wards from 5 May 1983 to 1 May 2003:

Wards from 1 May 2003 to 2 May 2019:

† minor boundary changes in 2007

Wards from 2 May 2019 to present:

Former district councils

Brighton
Wards from 1 April 1974 (first election 7 June 1973) to 5 May 1983:

Wards from 5 May 1983 to 1 April 1997 (district abolished):

Hove
Wards from 1 April 1974 (first election 7 June 1973) to 3 May 1979:

Wards from 3 May 1979 to 1 April 1997 (district abolished):

Electoral wards by constituency

Bexhill and Battle
Battle Town, Central, Collington, Cross In Hand/Five Ashes, Crowhurst, Darwell, Ewhurst and Sedlescombe,  Heathfield East, Heathfield North and Central, Herstmonceux, Kewhurst, Ninfield and Hooe with Wartling, Old Town, Pevensey and Westham, Rother Levels, Sackville, St Marks, St Michaels, St Stephens, Salehurst, Sidley, Ticehurst and Etchingham.

Brighton, Kemptown
East Brighton, East Saltdean and Telscombe Cliffs, Moulsecoomb and Bevendean, Peacehaven East, Peacehaven North, Peacehaven West, Queen's Park, Rottingdean Coastal, Woodingdean.

Brighton, Pavilion
Hanover and Elm Grove, Hollingdean and Stanmer, Patcham, Preston Park, Regency, St Peter's and North Laine, Withdean.

Eastbourne
Devonshire, Hampden Park, Langney, Meads, Old Town, Ratton, St Anthony's, Sovereign, Upperton, Willingdon.

Hastings and Rye
Ashdown, Baird, Braybrooke, Brede Valley, Castle, Central St Leonards, Conquest, Eastern Rother, Gensing, Hollington, Marsham, Maze Hill, Old Hastings, Ore, Rye, St Helens, Silverhill, Tressell, West St Leonards, Wishing Tree.

Hove
Brunswick and Adelaide, Central Hove, Goldsmid, Hangleton and Knoll, Hove Park, North Portslade, South Portslade, Westbourne, Wish.

Lewes
Alfriston, Barcombe and Hamsey, Chailey and Wivelsfield, Ditchling and Westmeston, East Dean, Kingston, Lewes Bridge, Lewes Castle, Lewes Priory, Newhaven Denton and Meeching, Newhaven Valley, Newick, Ouse Valley and Ringmer, Plumpton, Streat, East Chiltington and St John (Without), Polegate North, Polegate South, Seaford Central, Seaford East, Seaford North, Seaford South, Seaford West.

Wealden
Buxted and Maresfield, Chiddingly and East Hoathly, Crowborough East, Crowborough Jarvis Brook, Crowborough North, Crowborough St. Johns, Crowborough West, Danehill/Fletching/Nutley, Forest Row, Framfield, Frant/Withyham, Hailsham Central and North, Hailsham East, Hailsham South and West, Hartfield, Hellingly, Horam, Mayfield, Rotherfield, Uckfield Central, Uckfield New Town, Uckfield North, Uckfield Ridgewood, Wadhurst.

See also
List of parliamentary constituencies in East Sussex

References

Politics of East Sussex
East Sussex
Wards of East Sussex